Thomas Allen Haine (January 6, 1933 – September 10, 1994) was an American volleyball player who competed in the 1968 Summer Olympics. He was born in Minot, North Dakota and died in Honolulu, Hawaii. In 1991, Haine was inducted into the Volleyball Hall of Fame.

References

1933 births
1994 deaths
American men's volleyball players
Olympic volleyball players of the United States
Volleyball players at the 1968 Summer Olympics
Volleyball players at the 1967 Pan American Games
Pan American Games gold medalists for the United States
Pan American Games medalists in volleyball
Medalists at the 1967 Pan American Games
Hawaii Rainbow Warriors volleyball players